Dr. Kandeh Baba Conteh (born October 15, 1958) is a Sierra Leonean politician and political scientist. He is the leader of the Peace and Liberation Party (PLP).

Conteh was appointed ambassador of the Armed Forces Revolutionary Council junta in 1997.

Conteh, as the PLP candidate, placed sixth in the presidential election held on August 11, 2007, receiving 0.57% of the vote. Following the first round, on August 27 Conteh announced his party's support for second place candidate Solomon Berewa of the ruling Sierra Leone People's Party (SLPP) in the second round of the election. With the All People's Congress (APC) of Berewa's rival, Ernest Bai Koroma, having already won a majority in the parliamentary election held concurrently with the first round, Conteh said that there would be "a better balance" for the country if the presidency and parliament were controlled by different parties.

References

External links
http://www.nec-sierraleone.org/index_files/List%20of%20Presidntial%20Candidates%202012.pdf

Living people
Susu people
Members of the Parliament of Sierra Leone
Peace and Liberation Party politicians
Sierra Leonean political scientists
1958 births